A window seat is a miniature sofa without a back, intended to fill the recess of a window. In the latter part of the 18th century, when tall narrow sash windows were almost universal, the window seat was in high favor, and was no doubt in keeping with the formalism of Georgian interiors. It differed much in decorative detail, but little in form.

It stood as high from the floor as a chair; the two ends were identical, with a roll-over curve, more or less pronounced. The seats and ends were usually upholstered in rich fabrics which in many cases have remained intact. The legs followed the fashion in chairs and were square and tapered, or, somewhat later, round and reeded. Hepplewhite and the brothers Adam designed many graceful window seats, but they were produced by all the cabinet-makers of the period.

References

Furniture
Seats
Couches